Chemists Without Borders is a non-governmental organization involved in international development work designed to solve humanitarian problems through chemistry and related activities.  As a public benefit, non-profit organization, the primary goals of Chemists Without Borders include:
providing affordable medicines and vaccines to those who need them most
 providing clean water through water purification technologies
 supporting sustainable energy technologies
 encouraging open access to scholarly chemistry research articles throughout the world
 advocating a better understanding of chemistry through education

Chemists Without Borders was founded in 2004 by Bego Gerber and Steve Chambreau as a result of a letter that Gerber sent to the editor of Chemical and Engineering News in September 2004.

See also 
 Appropriate technology

External links 
 

Scientific organizations established in 2004
International scientific organizations
Chemistry organizations
International organizations based in the United States